Li Ai (born 4 January 1979 in Guangzhou, Guangdong), is a Chinese television personality, singer, actress and model.

In 1999, Li Ai represented her country of China in the Ford Models Supermodel of the World. Upon her return home, she focused on her studies while taking on national modeling jobs.

Li Ai released her first single called "我喜欢我自己这样" ("I like myself this way") in 2002, which scored her several music awards, including the global Chinese Media Pop Award and Oriental Billboard Award. She went on to become the host of the Chinese edition of America's Next Top Model called China's Next Top Model, as well as being a television correspondent for the 2008 Summer Olympics and the 2010 Asian Games.

She graduated from Guangzhou University with a management degree. She married her long-time boyfriend Zhang Xu Ning, a broker, on March 19, 2015.

Filmography 
 Go Lala Go! (2010)
 Single No More (2011)
 Dear Enemy (2011)
 Breakfast (2012)
 A Chilling Cosplay (2013)
 China Salesman (2017)

References

External links 
 

1979 births
Chinese female models
Hakka people
Living people
Guangzhou University alumni
Actresses from Guangzhou
Musicians from Guangzhou
Singers from Guangdong
21st-century Chinese women singers